Benoît Simian (born 27 May 1983) is a French politician of La République En Marche! (LREM) who has been serving as a member of the French National Assembly since the 2017 elections, representing Gironde's 5th constituency.

Political career
In parliament, Simian serves as member of the Finance Committee and the Committee on European Affairs. In addition to his committee assignments, he is part of the parliamentary friendship groups with Croatia and Spain.

At the initiative of Simian and Jean-Bernard Sempastous, some twenty LREM deputies who had been elected in rural areas established their interest group within the party's parliamentary group in September 2018. He joined the Horizons group.

He lost his seat in the first round of the 2022 French legislative election.

Political positions
In July 2019, Simian voted in favor of the French ratification of the European Union’s Comprehensive Economic and Trade Agreement (CETA) with Canada.

References

1983 births
Living people
Deputies of the 15th National Assembly of the French Fifth Republic
La République En Marche! politicians
21st-century French politicians